Lena Rivers is a lost 1925 American silent drama film directed by Whitman Bennett and starring Earle Williams and Gladys Hulette. It is based on the novel Lena Rivers by Mary Jane Holmes.

Synopsis
An unhappy woman falls for a man far above her station in life. To further exasperate her torment, she learns that her own father is the stepfather of the man she desires.

Cast
Earle Williams as Henry Rivers Graham
Johnnie Walker as Durward Belmont (credited as Johnny Walker)
Gladys Hulette as Lena Rivers
Edna Murphy as Carrie Nichols
Marcia Harris as Granny Nichols
Doris Rankin as Mathilde Nichols
Irma Harrison as Anne Nichols
Frank Sheridan as Henry Rivers Graham Jr.
Herman Lieb as Captain Atherton
Harlan Knight as The Old Sea Dog
Frank Andrews as Grandfather Nichols

References

External links
 

1925 films
American silent feature films
Lost American films
Films based on American novels
American black-and-white films
Silent American drama films
1925 drama films
Films directed by Whitman Bennett
1925 lost films
Lost drama films
Arrow Film Corporation films
1920s American films